Phaenicophilus is a genus of birds that was formerly placed in the family Thraupidae, but is now placed in the Hispaniolan tanager family Phaenicophilidae. Its members are sometimes known as palm-tanagers.

The genus Phaenicophilus was introduced by the English geologist and naturalist Hugh Edwin Strickland in 1851. The type species was subsequently designated as the black-crowned tanager.

The genus contains the following species:

References

 
Endemic birds of Hispaniola
Higher-level bird taxa restricted to the West Indies
Taxa named by Hugh Edwin Strickland
Taxonomy articles created by Polbot